Ella Kruglyanskaya (born 1978) is a Latvian painter who lives and works in New York. Kruglyanskaya is known for her drawings and paintings that exaggerate aspects of the female form. 

She has held solo exhibitions at Studio Voltaire in London in 2014, at Thomas Dane in London in 2015 and at  Tate Liverpool in 2016. Her work is included in the collections of the Tate Gallery, London.

References

External links
images of Kruglyanskaya's work on ArtNet

20th-century Latvian women artists
21st-century Latvian women artists
1978 births
Living people